This is a list of members of the South Australian House of Assembly from 2010 to 2014, as elected at the 2010 state election and two 2012 by-elections.

 The Labor member for Port Adelaide, former Deputy Premier and Treasurer Kevin Foley, resigned on 12 December 2011. Labor candidate Susan Close won the resulting by-election on 11 February 2012.
 The Labor member for Ramsay, former Premier Mike Rann, resigned on 13 January 2012. Labor candidate Zoe Bettison won the resulting by-election on 11 February 2012.

Members of South Australian parliaments by term
21st-century Australian politicians